The 2015–16 Azerbaijan First Division  is the second-level of football in Azerbaijan. Neftchala were the defending champions.

Teams
Kapaz, Ravan Baku and Zira were promoted to Azerbaijan Premier League, while Baku relegated to Azerbaijan First Division. Shusha and Lokomotiv-Bilajary were dissolved.

Stadia and locations
''Note: Table lists in alphabetical order.

League table

Results

Season statistics

Top scorers

Six Goals

Penta-trick

Poker

Hat-tricks

References

External links
 pfl.az
 AFFA 

Azerbaijan First Division seasons
Azerbaijan First Division
2